Greg Marzhew (né Lelesiuao, born 4 April 1997) is a New Zealand professional rugby league footballer who plays as a er for the Newcastle Knights in the NRL. 

He previously played for the Gold Coast Titans in the National Rugby League.

Background 
Born in Auckland, New Zealand, Marzhew is of Samoan descent. He played his junior rugby league for the Mangere East Hawks. 

In 2011, Marzhew moved to Melbourne, where he played for the North West Wolves in the Melbourne Rugby League.

In 2013, he moved to Logan City, Queensland, where he attended Woodridge State High School before being signed by the Gold Coast Titans.

In 2020, he changed his surname from Leleisiuao to Marzhew in honour of his maternal grandfather Ta’ilevao Marzhew.

Playing career

Early career
In 2014, Marzhew played for the Souths Logan Magpies in the Mal Meninga Cup. 

In 2015, he played for Gold Coast Green in the Mal Meninga Cup, before moving up to the Gold Coast Titans under-20s side. 

In 2016, he represented the Junior Kiwis in their 34–20 loss to the Junior Kangaroos. 

In 2017, he joined the Parramatta Eels, playing for their under-20 side. In May 2017, he again represented the Junior Kiwis. On 4 September 2017, he was named in the Holden Cup Team of the Year. On 1 October 2017, he scored a try in the Eels' Holden Cup Grand Final loss to the Manly-Warringah Sea Eagles.

In 2018 and 2019, Marzhew was a member of Parramatta's NRL squad but did not play a game for the club, instead playing for the Wentworthville Magpies, their NSW Cup feeder side.

On 30 September 2019, he was named in the NSW Cup Team of the Year.

In 2020, Marzhew returned to the Gold Coast, signing a two-year contract with the club.

2021
Marzhew began the 2021 NRL season playing for the Burleigh Bears in the Queensland Cup.
In Round 13 of the 2021 NRL season, Marzhew made his NRL debut against Melbourne.
In round 15, Marzhew scored two tries for the Gold Coast in a 56-24 loss against Manly-Warringah.

2022
Marzhew played a total of 17 games for the Gold Coast in the 2022 NRL season and scored nine tries as the club finished 13th on the table.

In November, Marzhew was released from his Gold Coast contract and signed a new three-year contact with the Newcastle Knights starting in 2023, in a player swap with Chris Randall.

References

External links 
Newcastle Knights profile
Gold Coast Titans profile

1997 births
Living people
Burleigh Bears players
New Zealand rugby league players
New Zealand people of Samoan descent
Gold Coast Titans players
Junior Kiwis players
Rugby league players from Auckland
Rugby league wingers
Wentworthville Magpies players